The FIBA Asia Under-20 Championship for Women refers to the women's under-20 championship for basketball in the International Basketball Federation's FIBA Asia zone. It was also formerly known as the Asian Basketball Confederation Championship for Young Women. The winners compete in the FIBA Under-21 World Championship for Women. FIBA no longer hold world championships for this age group.

Summary

Medal table

Participating nations

References

 
Women's basketball competitions in Asia between national teams
Recurring sporting events established in 2002
Asia
2002 establishments in Asia